The 2015 Murray State Racers football team represented Murray State University in the 2015 NCAA Division I FCS football season. They were led by first-year head coach Mitch Stewart and played their home games at Roy Stewart Stadium. They were a member of the Ohio Valley Conference. They finished the season 3–8, 2–6 in OVC play to finish in seventh place.

Schedule

Source: Schedule

References

Murray State
Murray State Racers football seasons
Murray State Racers football